Taysom Shawn Hill (born August 23, 1990) is an American football utility player officially designated as a tight end for the New Orleans Saints of the National Football League (NFL). He played college football at BYU and joined the Saints in 2017 as an undrafted free agent. Hill was listed as a quarterback on the Saints depth chart during his first five seasons, though he took snaps at seven different positions. Hill was designated as a tight end beginning in 2022. He has maintained a similar role on offense and special teams since transitioning to tight end, including as the primary gunner. Hill's array of roles has earned him a reputation as one of the NFL's unique players. Due to his versatility, he is known as "The Human Swiss Army Knife" by Saints' media.

Early years
Hill was born and raised in Pocatello, Idaho, where he lettered in football, basketball, and track at Highland High School and graduated in 2009. As a senior, he threw for 2,269 yards and 18 touchdowns, and rushed for 1,491 yards and 24 touchdowns, earning the All-Idaho Player of the Year, Idaho Gatorade High School Player of the Year, First Team All-State selection, and All-Region and All-Conference Player of the Year accolades. He holds the school single-season and career records for total offense.

In track, Hill competed in the 200 meters and long jump. As a sophomore at the 2007 5A District IV/V/VI Regional Meet, he recorded a personal-best time of 22.5 seconds in the 200 m, placing third, and ran the fourth leg on the  squad, helping the Rams to 1:31.41 and a first-place finish.

College career
Coming out of high school in 2009, Hill had multiple offers from programs in the West, including University of Arizona, Boise State University, Oregon State University, Washington State University, University of Utah, Stanford University, and Brigham Young University.

Heavily recruited by head coach Jim Harbaugh, Hill had originally committed to Stanford out of high school, but after returning from his LDS church mission, he enrolled in January at BYU after learning Stanford did not allow incoming freshmen to join the team until June.

In his freshman season of 2012, Hill was number two on the quarterback depth chart. He was initially brought in for special packages to utilize his athleticism in short-yardage situations. In his first pass as a college player, he threw an 18-yard touchdown pass against Washington State in the home opener. Hill played in 6 games in 2012, starting and winning two starts midseason before suffering a season-ending knee injury in the closing seconds of a victory over Utah State.

Hill resumed starting in the 2013 season. After a tough 19–16 loss in the season opener at Virginia, he bounced back the following week against Texas, with 259 yards rushing and three touchdowns in a 40–21 win. In 2014, Hill sustained a fractured leg against Utah State on October 3, ending his season. BYU lost their first game of the season that night.

Injury again struck Hill at the start of the 2015 season, when he suffered a lisfranc fracture during the opener against Nebraska on September 5. After the game, BYU head coach Bronco Mendenhall announced that the injury would cost Hill the rest of the season.

As a result, Hill was granted a medical redshirt for 2015, making him eligible to return for one final season in 2016. On February 16, he announced that he would be returning to BYU in 2016 rather than pursuing options to play at another school as a graduate transfer. On August 23, Hill was named the starting quarterback over sophomore Tanner Mangum, who had started after Hill's injury in 2015. Hill changed his jersey number from 4 to the number 7 that his late older brother Dexter had worn.

Late in 2016, Hill suffered a fourth season-ending injury. Against in-state rival Utah State on November 26, he went down with a hyper-extended elbow injury in the fourth quarter and was unable to finish the season.

Collegiate statistics

Professional career
Hill showed impressive athletic ability at BYU's pro day. His 40-yard dash of 4.44 seconds and 38.5-inch (0.98m) vertical jump would have finished first among all participating quarterbacks at the 2017 NFL Combine, beating Texas A&M's Trevor Knight's 4.54-second 40-yard dash and  vertical.

Green Bay Packers

Hill went undrafted in the 2017 NFL Draft, but signed with the Green Bay Packers as a free agent on May 5. He appeared in three preseason games with them, completing 14 of 20 passes, throwing for two touchdowns and rushing for another. He was released during the Packers final roster cut-down on September 2, 2017.

New Orleans Saints
The following day, Hill was claimed off waivers by the New Orleans Saints. He was promoted to the active roster on December 3 and appeared in a total of twelve special teams plays against the Carolina Panthers. In his NFL debut, Hill recorded two special teams tackles on the Panthers' kick returner Fozzy Whittaker.

2018 season
Hill was listed as the third-string quarterback to start 2018 season, but was used in a variety of positions throughout the Saints' season, including as their primary kick returner.

During Week 2 against the Cleveland Browns on September 16, he returned his first kick 47 yards as the Saints won 21–18. The next week against the Atlanta Falcons, he had his most versatile performance in his NFL career. On special teams, Hill returned three kicks for 64 yards and made a tackle on a punt. On offense, he rushed the ball three times for 39 yards and was often used as a tight end to block defenders. In the next game against the New York Giants, Hill completed his first NFL pass on a fake punt for 10 yards. He also rushed four times for 28 yards, continuing to line up at receiver on offense and still being the primary kick returner. Against the Washington Redskins, Hill rushed five times for 24 yards, including his first NFL touchdown run in a 43–19 victory. In a 30–20 Sunday Night Football road victory against the Minnesota Vikings on October 28, Hill set up the Saints' first touchdown of the game by completing a 44-yard pass to Michael Thomas, for his second pass completion of the year. During Week 14 against the Tampa Bay Buccaneers, he blocked a punt from Bryan Anger, which led to a touchdown that propelled the Saints to a come from behind 28–14 road victory, enabling them to clinch the division title. He was named NFC Special Teams Player of the Week.

Hill finished the season with 37 carries for 196 rushing yards and two rushing touchdowns, three receptions for four yards, and passed for 64 yards and an interception. In addition, he had 14 kickoff returns for 348 net yards for a 24.86 average.

In the Divisional Round against the Philadelphia Eagles, Hill made a key play as a utility player, running for a first down on a fake punt to begin the Saints' comeback victory. In the NFC Championship, against the Los Angeles Rams, Hill recorded a touchdown reception in the 26–23 overtime loss.

2019 season
In the season-opener against the Houston Texans, Hill rushed twice for eight yards and caught a nine-yard touchdown in the narrow 30–28 victory. In Week 7 against the Chicago Bears, Hill rushed twice for 21 yards and caught a screen pass for a four-yard touchdown in the 36–25 road victory. The next week, Hill saw his playing time increase as Drew Brees returned from injury and caught a career high three passes for 63 yards and a touchdown in the 31–9 win against the Arizona Cardinals. In Week 13 against the Atlanta Falcons on Thanksgiving, Hill blocked a punt, rushed for a 30-yard touchdown, and caught a three-yard touchdown pass in the 26–18 road victory. With his fourth touchdown reception of the year, Hill broke the record for most touchdown receptions by a quarterback in a single season. In Week 15 against the Indianapolis Colts on Monday Night Football, Hill caught two passes for 42 yards, including the 541st career touchdown pass thrown by Drew Brees, during the 34–7 win. In the Wild Card Round against the Minnesota Vikings, Hill had consecutive plays of 11-yard rushing for first down, 50-yard passing followed by a block that enabled a four-yard rushing touchdown by Alvin Kamara in a drive. Hill accumulated 50 yards rushing, 50 yards passing, and 25 yards receiving, including a touchdown late in the game. They ultimately fell to the Vikings 26–20 in overtime.

2020 season
In March 2020, the Saints placed a first-round restricted free agent tender on Hill worth $4.641 million. On April 26, Hill re-signed with the Saints to a two-year deal worth $16.3 million, an extension to the first-round restricted free agent tender placed on Hill, to bring the total deal up to around $21 million.

On November 20, 2020, it was announced that Hill would make his first career start at quarterback for the Saints Week 11 matchup against the Atlanta Falcons due to Drew Brees’ injury. Hill threw 23 passes, completing 18 for 233 yards. He also ran for 51 yards and two touchdowns, helping the Saints beat the Falcons 24–9. In Week 12 against the Denver Broncos, he recorded another game with two rushing touchdowns in the 31–3 victory. In Week 13 against the Atlanta Falcons, he had 232 passing yards and his first two career passing touchdowns in the 21–16 victory.  His last start of the season came in Week 14, where despite a two touchdown, 291 yard passing performance, the team would lose to the Eagles 24–21.

2021 season 

On March 14, 2021, the same day that starting quarterback Drew Brees announced his retirement, Hill signed a 4-year, $140 million extension with the Saints. The contract was structured in such a way as to free up salary cap space for New Orleans, saving them $7.75 million against the 2021 cap. He lost the 2021 Saints starting quarterback job to Jameis Winston. 

During the first half of the 2021 season, Hill spent the year as the third-string quarterback on the depth chart behind Jameis Winston and Trevor Siemian, though he continued in his role as a utility player, appearing in six of the first nine games as a runner, receiver, passer, and on special teams.  After a four-game losing streak, Hill was named to the starting quarterback role prior to a Week 13 Thursday Night Football game against the Dallas Cowboys.  Though he led the team in rushing with 101 yards on eleven carries, he threw four interceptions to only two touchdowns, and the team lost 27–17.  He fared better the next week against the New York Jets, going 15-for-21 for 175 yards and a 96.3 passer rating, as well as rushing for 73 yards and two touchdowns in a 30-9 blowout win.

Hill signed an additional contract extension with the Saints on November 22, 2021. On January 9, 2022, Hill suffered a Lisfranc injury in a game against the Atlanta Falcons, an injury that later required surgery.

2022 season 
New head coach Dennis Allen changed Hill's primary position from quarterback to tight end in March 2022. After the team re-signed Jameis Winston and picked up veteran Andy Dalton, it was decided that better use could be made of Hill's skill set as a tight end. Hill was expected to play as a motion tight end, flexed back from the line of scrimmage.

Although Hill began the season listed as a tight end on the Saints' depth chart, he primarily took snaps at quarterback in the wildcat formation to begin the season and would operate primarily as a rusher throughout the year. Hill generated 81 yards and a touchdown on four rushes against the Atlanta Falcons in Week 1 from this position.

Hill sat out Week 3 with a rib injury and returned in Week 4 against the Minnesota Vikings. He took snaps at quarterback, rotating with Andy Dalton. From the quarterback position, Hill scored his second touchdown of the season on a goal line play out of a shotgun formation. Hill also took snaps while positioned at wide receiver.

On October 9, Hill had one of the best statistical games of his career against the Seattle Seahawks, scoring a career-high four touchdowns in a 39–32 win. In total, he recorded nine carries for 122 yards and three touchdowns (including a go-ahead 60-yard touchdown run), completed his only pass for a 22-yard score, and recovered a fumble on special teams. For his performance, Hill was named NFC Offensive Player of the Week.

Hill scored his first receiving touchdown of the season in Week 7 against the Arizona Cardinals and completed both of his pass attempts for 48 yards. On the broadcast, longtime NFL play-by-play announcer Al Michaels referred to Hill as “Slash+” in reference to former NFL quarterback Kordell Stewart, who performed a similar role as Hill early in his career with the Pittsburgh Steelers.

In Week 14 against the Tampa Bay Buccaneers, Hill recorded two pass receptions for 35 yards and a touchdown. He added 10 yards on three carries and completed his only pass attempt for 22 yards. Hill took snaps at four different positions on offense in addition to his snaps taken on special teams.

Despite his depth chart categorization at a pass-catching position, Hill set new career highs for rushing attempts, rushing yards and yards per carry while totaling 9 receptions for 77 yards on 13 targets.

NFL career statistics

Regular season

Postseason

Personal life
Hill is the youngest of four children of Doug and Natalie Hill. He was named after Taysom Construction Company, formerly located in his hometown of Pocatello, Idaho.

Hill is a member of the Church of Jesus Christ of Latter-day Saints and served as a missionary for the church in Sydney, Australia, from 2009 to 2011. He married Emily Nixon in 2014 in the Salt Lake Temple in Salt Lake City, Utah. Hill's brother-in-law is former BYU and NFL linebacker David Nixon.

References

External links

 New Orleans Saints bio
 BYU Cougars bio

1990 births
Living people
21st-century Mormon missionaries
American football quarterbacks
American Mormon missionaries in Australia
BYU Cougars football players
Green Bay Packers players
Latter Day Saints from Idaho
New Orleans Saints players
Players of American football from Idaho
Sportspeople from Pocatello, Idaho